Sofia is a 2018 Belgian drama film written and directed by Meryem Benm'Barek-Aloïsi. It was screened in the Un Certain Regard section at the 2018 Cannes Film Festival. At Cannes, Meryem Benm'Barek-Aloïsi won the Un Certain Regard Award for Best Screenplay.

Plot
The film takes place in Casablanca, and it tells the story of a pregnant and unmarried young woman in her country, Morocco—where sexual relations out of wedlock are forbidden by law.

Cast
 Maha Alemi as Sofia
 Sarah Perles as Lena
 Hamza Khafif as Omar
 Lubna Azabal as Leila
 Faouzi Bensaïdi as Faouzi
 Nadia Benzakour as Fatiha
 Nadia Niazi as Zineb
 Ghita Fokri as Sanaa

References

External links
 

2018 films
2018 drama films
Belgian drama films
2010s French-language films
French-language Belgian films